Lloydsville is an unincorporated community in Belmont County, in the U.S. state of Ohio.

History
A former variant name was Loydsville. Lloydsville or Loydsville was laid out in 1831 by Joshua Loyd, and named for him. A post office called Lloydsville was established in 1832, and remained in operation until it was discontinued in 1907.

References

Unincorporated communities in Belmont County, Ohio
1831 establishments in Ohio
Populated places established in 1831
Unincorporated communities in Ohio